Henry Lee (Hank) Whitney (April 28, 1939 – April 5, 2020) was an American professional basketball player.

Whitney began his career with stints at several short-lived American Basketball League teams—the Los Angeles Jets, Chicago Majors, and Pittsburgh Rens—before spending a few seasons with the Allentown Jets. He then played for the New Jersey Americans / New York Nets.

References

External links
 Hank Whitney: Cyclone Trailblazer (February 3, 2014); Iowa State Cyclones

1939 births
2020 deaths
Allentown Jets players
American men's basketball players
Carolina Cougars players
Chicago Majors players
Houston Mavericks players
Iowa State Cyclones men's basketball players
New Jersey Americans players
New York Nets players
Pittsburgh Rens players
Power forwards (basketball)
Sportspeople from Brooklyn
Basketball players from New York City
Syracuse Nationals draft picks